Lincoln Peak is a tall peak subsidiary to Mount Baker in the Cascade Range in the U.S. state of Washington. It lies within the Mount Baker Wilderness and Mount Baker-Snoqualmie National Forest. The nearest higher peak is Colfax Peak,  to the east-northeast. Lincoln, Colfax, and Seward Peaks are erosional remnants from a much older eruptive episode, with more recent volcanic activity resulting in the nearby cone of the Mount Baker volcano.

See also
List of mountains of the United States
List of mountains by elevation

References

External links
 

Mountains of Washington (state)
Mountains of Whatcom County, Washington